HD 205765 is a star in the equatorial constellation of Aquarius. It is an A-type main sequence star with an apparent magnitude of 6.2, which, according to the Bortle scale, makes it faintly visible to the naked eye from dark rural skies. This star is spinning rapidly with a projected rotational velocity of 172 km/s.

References

External links
 Image HD 205765

Aquarius (constellation)
205765
A-type main-sequence stars
8263
106758
BD-01 4180